Cellana rota is a species of true limpet, a marine gastropod mollusc in the family Nacellidae, one of the families of true limpets.

References

 Christiaens J. (1986) Notes sur quelques Patellidae (Gastropoda) de l'Océan Indien. Apex 1(4): 97-127
 CIESM info

Nacellidae
Gastropods of New Zealand
Gastropods described in 1791
Taxa named by Johann Friedrich Gmelin